Las Tacas Airport ,  is an airport serving Las Tacas (es), a Pacific coastal resort in the Coquimbo Region of Chile.

Runway length does not include a  displaced threshold on Runway 35. There is high terrain north of the airport.

See also

Transport in Chile
List of airports in Chile

References

External links
OpenStreetMap - Las Tacas
OurAirports - Las Tacas
FallingRain - Las Tacas Airport

Airports in Chile
Airports in Coquimbo Region